Hydrochus is the only living genus of beetle in the family Hydrochidae, which belongs to the superfamily Hydrophiloidea. Hydrochus includes about 180 species, which are found worldwide. Hydrochus has also been used for a fly genus in the family Dolichopodidae. This junior homonym is a junior subjective synonym of the genus Rhaphium.

They are found in slow moving streams or stagnant water bodies, where they are associated with dense vegetation. In adults air is stored in a bubble on the underside of the body, with the antennae used to transfer atmospheric air to the bubble. The larvae live at the bottom of water bodies, indicating that they can breathe underwater. The diet is only known for the larvae of one species, H. japonicus, which feed on annelid worms belonging the family Naididae. The larvae also burrow into crevices, such as hollow dead grass, including to pupate. The adults are sluggish crawlers along surfaces, and are thought to consume algae and plant detritus. Eggs are laid in silk cases, often attached to (usually plant) substrates.

The club of the seven segmented antennae consists of three segments with a cup-like basal segment. The number of tarsi on the legs are usually 5-5-5 or 4-4-4 (a tiny basal segment can be hard to see). The pronotum narrows towards the rear but is narrower than the base of the elytra. An African species was formerly described under the genus Kiransus, but along with several other African species, it is now placed in Hydrochus. Hydrochids are considered to be an older branch of the Hydrophiloidea. Hydrochids have been suggested as a sister group of the Spercheidae and Hydrophilidae, but the relationships are unclear. Molecular phylogenetic comparisons suggest that they are related as a sister group to Helophorus and Georissus.

The oldest fossil of the modern genus is Hydrochus relictus from the Green River Formation of North America, dating to the Eocene. An extinct genus of the family, Ponohydrochus, is known from the Early Cretaceous (Hauterivian) Khasurty locality in Russia.

Species
More than 180 species have been described in the genus. The following list includes some of the species in the genus:

 Hydrochus aljibensis Castro & Delgado, 1999 g
 Hydrochus angusi Valladares, 1988 g
 Hydrochus angustatus Germar, 1824 g
 Hydrochus argutissimus 
 Hydrochus aschnaae 
 Hydrochus basilaris 
 Hydrochus bicarinatus 
 Hydrochus bituberculatus 
 Hydrochus brevis (Herbst, 1793) g
 Hydrochus brevitarsis Knisch, 1922 i c g
 Hydrochus brianbrowni Makhan, 2005 i c g
 Hydrochus callosus LeConte, 1855 i c g
 Hydrochus collaris 
 Hydrochus conjunctus 
 Hydrochus corruscans 
 Hydrochus crenatus (Fabricius, 1792) g
 Hydrochus currani Brown, 1929 i c g b
 Hydrochus debilis Sharp, 1882 i c g
 Hydrochus denarius 
 Hydrochus drakei Knisch, 1921 g
 Hydrochus elongatus (Schaller, 1783) g
 Hydrochus ensifer 
 Hydrochus excavatus LeConte, 1855 i c g b
 Hydrochus falsus Hellman in Worthington, Hellman, and Lago 2016
 Hydrochus farsicus g
 Hydrochus flavipennis Küster, 1852 g
 Hydrochus formosus 
 Hydrochus foveatus Haldeman, 1852 i c g
 Hydrochus grandicollis Kiesenwetter, 1870 g
 Hydrochus granulatus Blatchley, 1910 i c g b
 Hydrochus hellmani 
 Hydrochus ibericus Valladares, Diaz & Delgado, 1999 g
 Hydrochus ignicollis Motschulsky, 1860 g
 Hydrochus inaequalis LeConte, 1855
 Hydrochus jaechi Makhan, 1995 i c g
 Hydrochus japonicus Sharp, 1873 g
 Hydrochus jiawanae Makhan, 1996 i c g
 Hydrochus kellymilleri 
 Hydrochus kirgisicus Motschulsky, 1860 g
 Hydrochus lachmoni 
 Hydrochus leei 
 Hydrochus lobatus 
 Hydrochus mauriciogarciai 
 Hydrochus megaphallus van Berge Henegouwen, 1988 g
 Hydrochus minimus Blatchley, 1919 i c g
 Hydrochus neosquamifer Smetana, 1988 i c g
 Hydrochus nigeriensis 
 Hydrochus niloticus 
 Hydrochus nitidicollis Mulsant, 1844 g
 Hydrochus nodulifer 
 Hydrochus nooreinus Berge Henegouwen & Sainz-Cantero, 1992 g
 Hydrochus obscurus Sharp, 1882 i c g
 Hydrochus octocarinatus Hochhuth, 1871 g
 Hydrochus pajnii Makhan, 2000 i c g
 Hydrochus pallipes Chevrolat, 1863 i c g
 Hydrochus pictus 
 Hydrochus pseudosecretus 
 Hydrochus pseudosquamifer Miller, 1965 i c g b
 Hydrochus pupillus Orchymont, 1939 g
 Hydrochus ramcharani 
 Hydrochus roomylae Makhan, 2001 i c g
 Hydrochus rishwani 
 Hydrochus rufipes Melsheimer, 1844 i c g b
 Hydrochus rugosus Mulsant, 1844 i c g b
 Hydrochus sagittarius 
 Hydrochus scabratus Mulsant, 1844 i c g b
 Hydrochus schereri Makhan, 1995 i c g
 Hydrochus setosus Leech, 1948 i c g
 Hydrochus shorti 
 Hydrochus simplex Leconte, 1851 i c g b
 Hydrochus soekhnandanae 
 Hydrochus smaragdineus Fairmaire, 1879 g
 Hydrochus spangleri Hellman in Steiner, Staines, McCann and Hellman, 2003 i c g
 Hydrochus squamifer LeConte, 1855 i c g b
 Hydrochus subcupreus Randall, 1838 i c g b
 Hydrochus tariqi Ribera, Hernando & Aguilera, 1999 g
 Hydrochus tarsalis Chevrolat, 1863 i c g
 Hydrochus vagus LeConte, 1852 i c g
 Hydrochus tuberculatus 
 Hydrochus variabiloides 
 Hydrochus variolatus LeConte, 1851 i c g
 Hydrochus yadavi'' Makhan, 2000 i c g

Data sources: i = ITIS, c = Catalogue of Life, g = GBIF, b = Bugguide.net

References

Hydrophiloidea
Staphyliniformia genera